The 2009 Milwaukee Bonecrushers season was the 2nd season for the Continental Indoor Football League (CIFL) franchise. The Bonecrushers returned to action in 2009 with renewed optimism after signing LeRoy McFadden, brother of NFL player Darren McFadden, as its new head coach, as well as the previous year's CIFL Offensive Player of the Year, Randy Bell.  However, McFadden also chose to resign after just three games, leaving assistant coach, John Burns, to take over as head coach. While the Bonecrushers survived the 2009 season in Milwaukee, and in spite of bringing in top announcer Dennis J. O'Boyle to handle the public address and master of ceremonies duties at the U.S. Cellular Arena, attendance dwindled to nearly nothing and the team finished with a record of 3-8.

Schedule

Standings

References

Milwaukee Bonecrushers
2009 Continental Indoor Football League season
Milwaukee Bonecrushers